Feeding The Wolves is the third EP by Australian singer-songwriter Josh Pyke. It was released in November 2005 on Ivy League Records. The EP debuted on the ARIA Albums Chart on 6 February 2006 and peaked at number 64 two weeks later.

At the ARIA Music Awards of 2006, Feeding the Wolves was nominated for ARIA Award for Best Pop Release.

Track listing

Charts

Release history

References

2005 EPs
Josh Pyke albums
Ivy League Records EPs